Gregory Alexander Draper (born 13 August 1989) is an English-born New Zealand footballer and coach who is currently a player-coach with The New Saints under-21s.

Early life
Draper was born and raised in Chard, Somerset, before his parents decided to emigrate to Christchurch in New Zealand when he was 12 years old.

Club career
Having begun playing youth football at the age of ten, Draper joined Canterbury United shortly after moving to New Zealand. Having played for a number of clubs in Australia and New Zealand, Draper joined English non-league club  Basingstoke Town in August 2010 and made his competitive debut for the club on 17 August against St. Albans.

In June 2011 he joined The New Saints making his debut for the club on 18 June in a pre-season friendly against Cliftonville.  His competitive debut came on 30 June against the same team in a Europa League first qualifying round match, where he was a 74th-minute substitute. He scored his first competitive goal for his new club on 3 September in a Welsh Premier League game against Llanelli where he scored the only goal of the game.

His rich vein of form led to him being awarded the Welsh Premier League player of the month for February 2012. He finished the season as the club's top scorer and was awarded the club's player of the season award.

In the 2017–18 season, Draper won the Welsh Premier League golden boot for finishing as the league's top goalscorer with 22 goals. He repeated the feat the following year, scoring a career high 27 goals.

In May 2019 he signed a two-year contract extension with the club. Draper was released by the club at the end of the 2020–21 season.

In June 2021, Draper dropped down a division to join Cymru North side Guilsfield.

International career
He represented New Zealand national football team in the 2007 FIFA U-20 World Cup in Canada.

Draper was included in the New Zealand squad for the football tournament at the Summer Olympics in Beijing. He played in New Zealand's group matches against Brazil (0–5) and Belgium (0–1).

His senior international debut for the All Whites came in 2008 in a 2010 FIFA World Cup qualifier against Fiji.

He was called up March 2012 for the 2012 Olympic qualifiers and scored his first international goal in New Zealand's second group match against Tonga. Draper scored the only goal in the final to qualify New Zealand for the 2012 Olympic Games in Great Britain. He finished the qualifying tournament with three goals in four games. He was shortlisted for the final squad for the tournament.

Honours
The New Saints
 Welsh Premier League (9): 2011–12, 2012–13, 2013–14, 2014–15, 2015–16, 2016–17, 2017–18, 2018–19
 Welsh Cup (5): 2011–12, 2013–14, 2014–15, 2015–16, 2018–19
 Welsh League Cup (4): 2014–15, 2015–16, 2016–17, 2017–18

Individual
 Welsh Premier League Team of the Year: 2011–12, 2017–18
 Welsh Premier League Golden Boot (2): 2017–18, 2018–19

References

External links
 
 Wellington Phoenix profile
 NZF – New Zealand U-20 profile

Living people
1989 births
Association football forwards
New Zealand association footballers
New Zealand international footballers
New Zealand people of English descent
A-League Men players
Olympic association footballers of New Zealand
Wellington Phoenix FC players
Melbourne Knights FC players
People from Somerset
Canterbury United players
Basingstoke Town F.C. players
The New Saints F.C. players
Cymru Premier players
2008 OFC Nations Cup players
Footballers at the 2008 Summer Olympics
Expatriate footballers in Wales
New Zealand expatriate sportspeople in Wales
Cymru North players
The New Saints F.C. non-playing staff
Guilsfield F.C.players